Clarence Strait in northern Australia separates Melville Island from the mainland of Australia. It also connects the Beagle Gulf in the west to the Van Diemen Gulf in the east. It is approximately 50 km (31 mi) north of the city of Darwin.

Administrative status 
On 4 April 2007, most of the area occupied by the Clarence Strait was gazetted by the Northern Territory Government as a locality with the name, Vernon Islands.  The locality has not been added to any existing local government area and is considered to be part of the Northern Territory's unincorporated areas.

References

Coastline of the Northern Territory
Straits of Australia